Ainsworth Bay may refer to:

 Ainsworth Bay, Antarctica, an inlet in Antarctica
 Ainsworth Bay, Chile, an inlet in Tierra del Fuego, Chile